The 2018 season is Home United's 23rd consecutive season in the top flight of Singapore football and in the S.League. Along with the S.League, the club will also compete in the Prime League, the Singapore Cup, Singapore League Cup.

Key events

Pre-season 
 On 15/10/2017, it was reported that key striker, Stipe Plazibat, is looking for a move to Thailand with Bangkok Glass interested.
 On 7/11/2017, Irfan Fandi revealed in an interview that he is looking to make an overseas move once he finishes National Service (NS) next February.
 On 7/11/2017, coach Aidil Sharin is rumored to be courted by MSL clubs, namely Felda United, PKNS FC and Kelantan.  He was said to have met up Felda United and will be meeting Kelantan management before end of season.
 On 21/11/2017, it was reported that Harris had returned to JDT.
 On 28/11/2017, Tsubasa Sano from Albirex Niigata (S) or Darryl Roberts from Global Cebu F.C. or Fernando Rodríguez from Ceres–Negros F.C. are identified as the replacement for top scorer, Stipe Plazibat.
 On 29/11/2017, Bangkok Glass make offer for Irfan Fandi for 2018 season.  However, he is still considering the offer as he is looking to move to Europe.
 On 2/12/2017, Faris Ramli is reported to have rejected a move to Malaysia club to sign a one-year extension to his contract.  However, he is reported to have negotiated a deal with Selangor FA for the new season as his new contract with Home United contained a clause for him to leave.
 On 14/12/2017, Irfan Fandi & his brother, Ikhsan Fandi will go trial with English Championship club, Leeds United in March 2018.
 On 15/12/2017, Stipe Plazibat reportedly completed his move to Thailand.  
 On 15/12/2017, Adam Swandi was reported to be close to a move to White Swan, dealing a blow to the team for the 2018 season.

In-season 
 On 9/8/2018, the team was crowned as AFC Cup ASEAN Zonal winners after defeating Philippines’ Ceres Negros 3–1 on aggregate over two legs. 
 On 26/9/2018, it was reported that Geylang International is interested in bringing Song Ui-young to Bedok Stadium together with their former coach, Lee Lim Saeng for Season 2019.  Joining the Eagles to express interest is Indonesian giants Persija Jakarta.
 On 26/9/2018, it was reported that Aidil Shahril is courted by Perak FA for 2019 while their former coach Lee Lim Saeng is also a target for Warriors FC.

Squad

S.League squad

Coaching staff

Transfer

Pre-season transfer

In

Out 

Note 1: Khairul Nizam was reported to have been retained by the club but subsequently transferred to Warriors FC. 

Note 2: Faris Ramli was reported to have signed an extension of contract but subsequently moved to PKNS FC after a clause was included in his new contract.

Retained

Extension

Promoted

Trial

Trial (In)

Trial (Out)

Mid-season transfers

In

Extension

Friendlies

Pre-season friendlies

PSM Makassar Super Cup Asia 2018

KL Pre-season tour

Team statistics

Appearances and goals

Competitions

Overview

Singapore Premier League

AFC Cup

Group stage

Knockout stage

Home United won 6-3 on aggregate.

Home United won 3-1 on aggregate.

Home United lost 1-11 on aggregate.

Singapore Cup

Home United won 4-3 on aggregate.

Home United lost 2-4 on aggregate.

References 

Home United FC
Home United FC seasons